This is the discography for American singer-songwriter and musician Uncle Kracker.

Albums

Studio albums 

Notes
A ^ Midnight Special peaked at number 33 on the Billboard Top Country Albums chart and number 16 on the Billboard Independent Albums chart.

Compilation albums

Extended plays

Singles

Featured singles

Videography

Music videos

Guest appearances

Notes

References

Country music discographies
Discographies of American artists
Pop music discographies
Rap rock discographies